
Olsztyn County is a unit of territorial administration and local government (powiat) in Warmian-Masurian Voivodeship, northern Poland. It came into being on January 1, 1999, as a result of the Polish local government reforms passed in 1998. Its administrative seat is the city of Olsztyn, although the city is not part of the county (it constitutes a separate city county).

As of 2006 its total population is 113,529, out of which the population of Dobre Miasto is 10,489, that of Biskupiec is 10,348, that of Olsztynek is 7,591, that of Barczewo is 7,401, that of Jeziorany is 3,376, and the rural population is 74,324.

Neighbouring counties
Apart from the city of Olsztyn, Olsztyn County is also bordered by Lidzbark County and Bartoszyce County to the north, Kętrzyn County and Mrągowo County to the east, Szczytno County to the south-east, Nidzica County to the south, and Ostróda County to the west.

Administrative division
The county is subdivided into 12 gminas (five urban-rural and seven rural). These are listed in the following table, in descending order of population.

External links
Polish official population figures 2006

 
Olsztyn